Amynander is a given name. Notable people with the name include:

Amynander of Athamania, a king of the Athamanes in south Epirus  200 BC
Amynander, a character in Timaeus, one Plato's dialogues